Charata Airport  is an airport serving the town of Charata in the Chaco Province of Argentina. The airport is at the western edge of Charata.

The airport has crossing runways. Runway 10/28 is only partially marked.

See also

Transport in Argentina
List of airports in Argentina

References

External links
OpenStreetMap - Charata
OurAirports - Charata Airport

Airports in Chaco Province